Puzosia is a genus of desmoceratid ammonites, and the type genus for the Puzosiinae, which lived during the middle part of the Cretaceous, from early Aptian to Maastrichtian (125.5 to 70.6 Ma). Sepkoski defines the range from Albian to Santonian. The generic name comes from the Serbian words "Puž" (snail) and "oce/ose" (axis), gaining its name from the shell's snail-like appearance.

Subgenera and species 

 Puzosia (Anapuzosia) Matsumoto 1954
 Puzosia (Bhimaites) Matsumoto 1954
 Puzosia (Bhimaites) bhima Stoliczka 1865
 Puzosia (Puzosia) Bayle 1878
 Puzosia (Puzosia) mayoriana d'Orbigny 1841
 Puzosia (Puzosia) planulatus Sowerby 1827
 Puzosia alaskana Imlay 1960
 Puzosia bistricta White 1887
 Puzosia brasiliana Maury 1936
 Puzosia crebrisulcata Kossmat 1898
 Puzosia dilleri Anderson 1902
 Puzosia garajauana Maury 1936
 Puzosia lata Seitz 1931
 Puzosia longmani Whitehouse 1926
 Puzosia lytoceroides Haas 1952
 Puzosia media Seitz 1931
 Puzosia quenstedti Parona and Bonarelli 1897
 Puzosia rosarica Maury 1936
 Puzosia skidegatensis McLearn 1972

Description 
The shell of Puzosia is basically discoidal, evolute to subinvolute, with a wide umbiicaus. Sides bear close spaced sinuous ribs, periodically interrupted by narrow sinuous constrictions, about six per whorl.  Whorl section is somewhat compressed, higher than wide, with slightly convex sides and rounded venter. The suture is complexly ammonitic.

Distribution 
Fossils of species within this genus have been found in the Cretaceous sediments of Angola, Argentina, Australia, Brazil, Canada, Colombia (Tolima), Egypt, France, Germany, India, Iran, Italy, Japan, Madagascar, Mexico, New Zealand, Nigeria, Peru, Russia, South Africa, Spain, Suriname, the United Kingdom, United States.

In 2019, a Puzosia (Bhimaites) shell was found fossilized in a 99 million-year-old chunk of Burmese amber from Myanmar, marking the first known discovery of an ammonite preserved in amber. The ammonite's shell was presumably picked up and preserved after the resin fell off a tree and tumbled across the seashore.

References

Further reading 
 W.J. Arkell et al., 1957. Mesozoic Ammonoidea L365, Treatise on Invertebrate Paleontology, Part L, Ammonoidea. Geological Society of America and Univ Kansas Press.

Ammonitida genera
Desmoceratidae
Cretaceous ammonites
Ammonites of Africa
Cretaceous Africa
Ammonites of Asia
Cretaceous Asia
Ammonites of Europe
Cretaceous Europe
Cretaceous France
Ammonites of North America
Cretaceous Canada
Cretaceous Mexico
Cretaceous United States
Ammonites of South America
Cretaceous Argentina
Cretaceous Brazil
Cretaceous Colombia
Cretaceous Peru
Aptian genus first appearances
Albian genera
Cenomanian genera
Turonian genera
Coniacian genera
Santonian genera
Campanian genera
Maastrichtian genus extinctions
Fossil taxa described in 1878
Fossils of Serbia